Lukáš Lacko was the defending champion but lost in the second round to Egor Gerasimov.

Alexander Bublik won the title after defeating Lukáš Rosol 6–4, 6–4 in the final.

Seeds

Draw

Finals

Top half

Bottom half

References
Main Draw
Qualifying Draw

Slovak Open - Singles
2018 Singles